was a railway station on the Sekisho Line in Yūbari, Hokkaido, Japan, operated by Hokkaido Railway Company (JR Hokkaido). Opened in 1962, it closed in March 2016.

Lines
Tomisato Station was served by the Sekisho Line, and was situated 40.2 km from the starting point of the line at Minami-Chitose Station. The station was numbered "K19".

Station layout
The station had two side platforms serving two tracks.

Adjacent stations

History
The station opened on 25 December 1962. With the privatization of Japanese National Railways (JNR) on 1 April 1987, the station came under the control of JR Hokkaido.

Closure
In September 2015, it was announced that JR Hokkaido planned to close this station in March 2016. The station closed following the last day of services on 25 March 2016.

See also
 List of railway stations in Japan

References

Railway stations in Hokkaido Prefecture
Stations of Hokkaido Railway Company
Railway stations in Japan opened in 1962
Railway stations closed in 2016
2016 disestablishments in Japan